Lutton is a village and civil parish in North Northamptonshire, England. The 2011 Census recorded its parish population as 186.

The villages name means 'Farm/settlement connected with Luda' or perhaps, 'farm/settlement on Hluding (= the loud one)', an old name for what is now called Billing Brook.

The oldest parts of the Church of England parish church of St Peter are 12th-century. North and south aisles and arcades were added to the nave in the 13th century. The church is a Grade I listed building.

References

Further reading

External links

Civil parishes in Northamptonshire
North Northamptonshire
Villages in Northamptonshire